Nosferatu molango (previously placed in the genus Herichthys), also known as Atezca Cichlid, is a species of cichlid endemic to the "Laguna Atezca", in the headwaters of the Rio Moctezuma (Rio Panuco Basin), in the municipality of Molango, state of Hidalgo, Mexico at 1,270 meters above sea level. It is distinguished from other species of the genus in "having a slender (slightly broader than long), well-spaced, unicuspid and conical, posterior slightly flattened, indented lower pharyngeal plate (instead of having large molars), with 2 rows of 8–9 medium-sized, lightly pigmented molars that flank the midline; 11–13 nonenlarged conic teeth along the posterior margin. Distinguished from all other species in the genus by a combination of the following characters: predorsal contour deep and nonacute, which is not concave before the eye; head short (mean 35%, SD 3%), rostral tip to the pectoral fin origin distance (mean 33%, SD 1%); caudal peduncle short (mean 15%, SD 1%) and deep (mean 16%, SD 1%), long anal fin (origin to hypural base distance; mean 40%, SD 1%); wide preorbit (mean 30%, SD 3%); eye small (mean 21%, SD 2%). Peritoneum is uniformly very dark."

Its live color is light goldenrod to olive in dorsal areas and very light on the flanks and belly. Snout and head are densely covered with speckles that extend posteriorly to nuchal area and onto gill cleft. Scales over flanks fringed by diamond-shaped darker outlines (scale-pockets), thicker over posterior-ventral half, giving the flanks a reticulate appearance. All specimens with red marking at axil, behind pectoral fin. Dorsal and caudal fins are same color as the body with four lines of red dots extending onto soft areas and conspicuous on inter-radial membranes. Tip of caudal fin reddish.

Conservation
The Aztec cichlid has been effectively extirpated from Laguna Azteca. The species and its habitat have been severely impacted by the introduction of tilapias, largemouth bass (Micropterus salmoides) and sunfish (Lepomis spp.), which greatly threaten the viability of the entire N. molango population.

References

molango
Cichlid fish of Central America
Fish described in 2013
Taxa named by Mauricio De la Maza-Benignos
Taxa named by María de Lourdes Lozano-Vilano